Zelotibia is a genus of African ground spiders that was first described by A. Russell-Smith & J. A. Murphy in 2005.

Species
 it contains twenty-two species:
Zelotibia acicula Russell-Smith & Murphy, 2005 – Congo
Zelotibia angelica Nzigidahera & Jocqué, 2009 – Burundi
Zelotibia bicornuta Russell-Smith & Murphy, 2005 – Tanzania
Zelotibia cultella Russell-Smith & Murphy, 2005 – Congo
Zelotibia curvifemur Nzigidahera & Jocqué, 2009 – Burundi
Zelotibia dolabra Russell-Smith & Murphy, 2005 – Congo
Zelotibia filiformis Russell-Smith & Murphy, 2005 – Congo, Burundi
Zelotibia flexuosa Russell-Smith & Murphy, 2005 – Congo, Rwanda
Zelotibia fosseyae Nzigidahera & Jocqué, 2009 – Burundi
Zelotibia johntony Nzigidahera & Jocqué, 2009 – Congo
Zelotibia kaibos Russell-Smith & Murphy, 2005 – Kenya
Zelotibia kanama Nzigidahera & Jocqué, 2009 – Rwanda
Zelotibia kibira Nzigidahera & Jocqué, 2009 – Burundi
Zelotibia lejeunei Nzigidahera & Jocqué, 2009 – Congo
Zelotibia major Russell-Smith & Murphy, 2005 – Burundi
Zelotibia mitella Russell-Smith & Murphy, 2005 (type) – Congo
Zelotibia papillata Russell-Smith & Murphy, 2005 – Congo, Rwanda
Zelotibia paucipapillata Russell-Smith & Murphy, 2005 – Congo, Burundi
Zelotibia scobina Russell-Smith & Murphy, 2005 – Congo
Zelotibia simpula Russell-Smith & Murphy, 2005 – Congo, Kenya
Zelotibia subsessa Nzigidahera & Jocqué, 2009 – Burundi
Zelotibia supercilia Russell-Smith & Murphy, 2005 – Congo

References

Araneomorphae genera
Gnaphosidae